Elmwood is a historic plantation house located near Loretto, Essex County, Virginia. It was built in 1774, and is a two-story, five bay, brick dwelling with a hipped roof and shallow central projecting pavilion in the Georgian style.  It features a Palladian window and a one-story porch extending the length of the facade. The house was remodeled in 1852, much of which was later removed. It was the birthplace and home of Muscoe Russell Hunter Garnett, and was the home and burial place of his grandfather James M. Garnett.

It was listed on the National Register of Historic Places in 1970.

References

External links
Elmwood, State Route 640 vicinity, Loretto, Essex County, VA: 18 photos and 4 data pages at Historic American Buildings Survey

Historic American Buildings Survey in Virginia
Plantation houses in Virginia
Houses on the National Register of Historic Places in Virginia
Georgian architecture in Virginia
Houses completed in 1774
Houses in Essex County, Virginia
National Register of Historic Places in Essex County, Virginia
1774 establishments in Virginia
Garnett family of Virginia